Bernheim is a surname. Notable people with the surname include:

 Alain Bernheim (born 1931), French Masonic author
 Alain Bernheim (producer) (1922–2009), French-born American film producer and literary agent
 Emile Bernheim (1886–1985), Belgian industrialist
 Emmanuèle Bernheim (1955–2017), French writer
 Ernst Bernheim (1850–1942), German-Jewish historian
 Erwin Bernheim (1925–2007), Swiss founder of Mondaine Watch Ltd.
 Hippolyte Bernheim (1837–1919), French Jewish physician and neurologist
 Gilles Bernheim (born 1952), chief rabbi of France 2009–2013
 Isaac Wolfe Bernheim (1848–1945), Jewish distiller and philanthropist, founder of the I. W. Harper bourbon brand and the Bernheim Arboretum and Research Forest
 Louis Bernheim (1861–1931), Belgian general
Mary Bernheim (Hare) (1902–1997), British-American biochemist

See also
 Bernheim petition, 1933 petition leading to the vacation of Nazi anti-Jewish legislation in German Upper Silesia until 1937.
 3467 Bernheim, an asteroid
 Bernheim Arboretum and Research Forest, a park located twenty miles south of Louisville, Kentucky
 Bernheim-Jeune, Art gallery and publisher in Paris

 Jewish surnames